The William H. Yawkey Boathouse is located in Hazelhurst, Wisconsin, United States. It was added to the National Register of Historic Places in 2009.

History
Constructed in 1917, the boathouse was owned by William H. Yawkey (1875–1919), who also owned the Detroit Tigers professional baseball team.

References

External links
 William H. Yawkey Boathouse at wisconsinhistory.org

Boathouses in the United States
Buildings and structures in Oneida County, Wisconsin
Buildings and structures completed in 1917
National Register of Historic Places in Oneida County, Wisconsin
Boathouses on the National Register of Historic Places in Wisconsin